The 2006 LG Hockey Games were played between April 26 and April 29, 2006 in Stockholm, Sweden. The tournament was played in late-April instead of early-February because of the 2006 Olympic tournament in Torino, Italy.

Final standings

Matches

References

External links
Hockeyarchives 

2005–06 Euro Hockey Tour
2005–06 in Swedish ice hockey
2005–06 in Russian ice hockey
2005–06 in Finnish ice hockey
2005–06 in Czech ice hockey
Sweden Hockey Games
April 2006 sports events in Europe
2000s in Stockholm